Alpha-crystallin B chain is a protein that in humans is encoded by the CRYAB gene. It is part of the small heat shock protein family and functions as molecular chaperone that primarily binds misfolded proteins to prevent protein aggregation, as well as inhibit apoptosis and contribute to intracellular architecture. Post-translational modifications decrease the ability to chaperone. Mutations in CRYAB cause different cardiomyopathies, skeletal myopathies mainly myofibrillar myopathy, and also cataracts. In addition, defects in this gene/protein have been associated with cancer and neurodegenerative diseases such as  Alzheimer's disease and Parkinson's disease.

Structure 

Crystallins are separated into two classes: taxon-specific, or enzyme, and ubiquitous. The latter class constitutes the major proteins of vertebrate eye lens and maintains the transparency and refractive index of the lens. Since lens central fiber cells lose their nuclei during development, these crystallins are made and then retained throughout life, making them extremely stable proteins. Mammalian lens crystallins are divided into alpha, beta, and gamma families; beta and gamma crystallins are also considered as a superfamily. Alpha and beta families are further divided into acidic and basic groups.

Seven protein regions exist in crystallins: four homologous motifs, a connecting peptide, and N- and C-terminal extensions. Alpha crystallins are composed of two gene products: alpha-A and alpha-B, for acidic and basic, respectively. These heterogeneous aggregates consist of 30–40 subunits; the alpha-A and alpha-B subunits have a 3:1 ratio, respectively.

Function 

Alpha B chain crystallins (αBC) can be induced by heat shock, ischemia, and oxidation, and are members of the small heat shock protein (sHSP also known as the HSP20) family. They act as molecular chaperones although they do not renature proteins and release them in the fashion of a true chaperone; instead, they bind improperly folded proteins to prevent protein aggregation.

Furthermore, αBC may confer stress resistance to cells by inhibiting the processing of the pro-apoptotic protein caspase-3. Two additional functions of alpha crystallins are an autokinase activity and participation in the intracellular architecture. Alpha-A and alpha-B gene products are differentially expressed; alpha-A is preferentially restricted to the lens and alpha-B is expressed widely in many tissues and organs. Elevated expression of alpha-B crystallin occurs in many neurological diseases; a missense mutation cosegregated in a family with a desmin-related myopathy.

Clinical significance 

Although not yet clearly understood, defective chaperone activity is expected to trigger the accumulation of protein aggregates and underlie the development of α-crystallinopathy, or the failure of protein quality control, resulting in protein deposition diseases such as Alzheimer’s disease and Parkinson’s disease. Mutations in CRYAB could also cause restrictive cardiomyopathy. ER-anchored αBC can suppress aggregate formation mediated by the disease mutant. Thus, modulation of the micromilieu surrounding the ER membrane can serve as a potential target in developing pharmacological interventions for protein deposition disease.

Though expressed highly in eye lens and muscle tissues, αBC can also be found in several types of cancer, among which head and neck squamous cell carcinoma (HNSCC) and breast carcinomas, as well as in patients with tuberous sclerosis. αBC expression is associated with metastasis formation in HNSCC and in breast carcinomas and in other types of cancer, expression is often correlated with poor prognosis as well. The expression of αBC can be increased during various stresses, like heat shock, osmotic stress or exposure to heavy metals, which then may lead to prolonged survival of cells under these conditions.

Interactions 

CRYAB has been shown to interact with:
 CRYAA,
 CRYBB2, 
 CRYGC, 
 HSPB2, 
 Hsp27,  and
 PSMA3.

References

Further reading

External links 
  GeneReviews/NIH/NCBI/UW entry on Myofibrillar Myopathy

Heat shock proteins